TPI may refer to:

Medicine 
 Tehran Psychiatric Institute, an Iranian research institute
 Tianyin Pharmaceutical, a Chinese pharmaceutical company
 TPI test, used to detect presence of Treponema pallidum bacteria
 Triosephosphate isomerase, an enzyme

Technology 
 Tire Pressure Indicator, a product by NIRA Dynamics AB
 TPI Specialties, an American auto parts manufacturer 
 True Performance Index, a measurement for AMD processors
 Teeth per inch, on a saw blade

Units of measure 
 Thread count, or threads per inch, used in the textile industry
 Threads per inch, used with threaded fasteners
 Tracks per inch, of magnetic storage media
 Twist per inch, or turns per inch, used in the textile industry

Other uses 
 MNCTV, an Indonesian television network formerly named TPI (Televisi Pendidikan Indonesia)
 Tangail Polytechnic Institute, in Bangladesh
 Tapini Airport, in Papua New Guinea
 Tarup-Paarup IF, a Danish association football club
 Technique Polytechnic Institute, in West Bengal, India
 Ted Petty Invitational, an independent wrestling tournament in North America
 Third-party inspection company
 Tibet Policy Institute, a think tank of the Central Tibetan Administration
 Tok Pisin, a language of Papua New Guinea
 Town Planning Institute, later the Royal Town Planning Institute, a professional organisation in the United Kingdom
 TPI Polene, a Thai cement manufacturer
 TPI theory, in human resource management
 Trading Places International, an American vacation services corporation
 Triebold Paleontology Incorporated, an American fossil company
 Tube Products of India, an Indian steel manufacturer
 Two person integrity, a communications security measure